Tess Sugnaux (born 3 March 1995) is a Swiss tennis player.

Sugnaux has a career-high singles ranking of 413 by the Women's Tennis Association (WTA), achieved on 8 May 2017. She also has a career-high WTA doubles ranking of 542, set on 1 August 2022. She has won one singles title and four doubles titles on the ITF Women's Circuit.

Sugnaux made her WTA Tour debut at the 2019 Ladies Open Lausanne, when she received a wildcard into the main draw.

ITF Circuit finals

Singles: 16 (2 titles, 14 runner–ups)

Doubles: 9 (4 titles, 5 runner–ups)

References

External links
 
 

1995 births
Living people
Swiss female tennis players
21st-century Swiss women